Dynamo Basketball Club, also known as Dynamo, is a basketball club based in Bujumbura, Burundi. Established in 1968, the team competes in both the Viva Basketball League and the Bujumbura Amateurs Basketball Club Association (ACBAB).

History 
The team was founded in 1968.

On September 25, 2016, Dynamo won its first-ever Burundian National Championship.

In the 2017–18 season, Dynamo had a historically successful season, winning the ACBAB title, Heroes Cup, and President's Cup. Their Bujumbura title was their first since 20 years earlier, in 1998.

The team captured another ACBAB championship in 2019, Dynamo qualified for the 2020 BAL Qualifying Tournaments.

Honours 
Burundian National Championship

 Champions (3): 1998, 2016, 2018

ACBAB

 Champions (3): 1998, 2018, 2019

In African competitions
BAL Qualifiers (1 appearance)
2020 – First Round

Personnel

2019 roster 
The following was Dynamo's roster for the 2021 BAL qualification in October 2019.

References

External links 
Dynamo at Afrobasket.com

Basketball teams in Burundi
Basketball teams established in 1968
Bujumbura
1968 establishments in Africa
Road to BAL teams